Darren Barry (born 2 February 1990) is an English rugby union player who plays for Vannes in the Pro D2.

Club career
Barry was part of Bristol academy system where he enjoyed a loan spell at Clifton near Bristol. Barry made his senior debut when they beat Cornish Pirates 60-15 at Camborne in May 2010 and made his 50th appearance for Bristol winning against the Pirates won 50-22 in the British and Irish Cup at the Mennaye Field in September 2011.

In July 2012, Barry left Bristol to join Cornish Pirates in the RFU Championship from the 2012-13 season. On 25 March 2015, Barry left Cornwall to join Western rivals Worcester Warriors in the Aviva Premiership ahead of the 2015-16 season. On 20 May 2016, Barry signed a contract extension to stay with the club at Sixways Stadium.

On 17 April 2019, Barry returns to the RFU Championship with Newcastle Falcons from the 2019-20 season.

On 5 April 2021, Barry would leave Newcastle to sign for Pro D2 side Vannes in France as medical joker for the rest of the 2020-21 season.

International career
Barry was a regular member of the England U19s squad while still with Bristol. Barry was selected for a RFU Championship XV team that defeated Canada 28-23 as part of their  2014 autumn tests, which was held at the Sixways Stadium in Worcester.

References

External links
Worcester Warriors Profile
Cornish Pirates Profile

English rugby union players
1990 births
Living people
Worcester Warriors players
Cornish Pirates players
Bristol Bears players
Rugby union players from Bristol
Rugby union locks